Tyler Jacks is a David H. Koch Professor of Biology at the Massachusetts Institute of Technology (MIT), a long-time HHMI investigator, and Founding Director of the David H. Koch Institute for Integrative Cancer Research, which brings together biologists and engineers to improve detection, diagnosis, and treatment of cancer. Dr. Jacks is a member of the board of directors of Thermo Fisher Scientific and Amgen, two of the major biotechnology corporations in the world.  He is the President of Break Through Cancer, a foundation dedicated to supporting multi-institutional teams of researchers focused on finding solutions to some of the most difficult to treat cancers. He is also a member of the Board of Overseers, the larger of two governing boards of Harvard University.

Early life
Tyler Jacks graduated magna cum laude with Highest Honors in biology from Harvard University in 1983 and earned a PhD in biochemistry from the University of California, San Francisco in 1988 under the guidance of Nobel Laureate Harold Varmus. He then went on to do postdoctoral research at MIT in the Whitehead Institute in the lab of Robert Weinberg.

Career
He was named an Assistant Professor at MIT in 1992 and Associate Professor with tenure in 1997. In 2000, he was promoted to full Professor standing. He has taught the spring version of introductory biology (7.013) at MIT with Professor Hazel Sive and currently teaches The Hallmarks of Cancer (7.45) at MIT with Professor Matthew Vander Heiden.

He served on the Board of Scientific Advisors of the National Cancer Institute and is a past president of the American Association for Cancer Research. He also sits on the board of directors at Thermo Fisher Scientific, Inc. and Aveo Pharmaceuticals Inc. He is a member of the Scientific Advisory Board at T2Biosystems, Inc. and at Epizyme, Inc. He was a founding co-editor of the Annual Review of Cancer Biology in 2017, serving until 2021.

Research
He has pioneered the use of gene-targeting technology in mice to study cancer-associated genes and to construct mouse models of many human cancer types. The Jacks lab studies the genetic events that lead to the development of cancer. The lab focuses on using a series of mouse strains carrying engineered mutations known to be involved in human cancer. Through loss-of-function and gain-of-function mutations in tumor suppressor genes as well as the K-ras oncogene, mouse models of many types of cancer have been constructed, including pancreatic cancer, astrocytoma, endometrioid ovarian cancer, colorectal cancer, sarcoma, retinoblastoma, and tumors of the peripheral nervous system.

Awards and recognitions
In 1997, he received the Rhoads Award from the American Association for Cancer Research. In 1998, he won the Amgen Award from the American Society for Biochemistry and Molecular Biology. He has also been named a Ludwig Research Scholar in Cancer Biology from Johns Hopkins University. In 2002, he won the Chestnut Hill Award for Excellence in Medical Research, and in 2005 he won the Paul Marks Prize for Cancer Research. He was elected to the National Academy of Sciences in 2009. In 2014, he was presented the Hope Funds for Cancer Research Award of Excellence for Basic Research.

References

Publications
Kumar MS, Lu j, Mercer KL, Golub, TR and Jacks T. 2007. Impaired microRNA processing enhances cellular transformation and tumorigenesis. Nature Genetics, 39(5):673-677
Shaw AT, Meissner A, Dowdle JA, Crowley D, Magendantz M, Ouyang C, Parisi T, Rajagopal J, Blank LJ, Bronson RT, Stone JR, Tuveson DA, Jaenisch, R, and Jacks, T. 2007. Sprouty-2 Regulates Oncogenic K-ras in Lung Development and Tumorigenesis. Genes & Development, 21(6):694-707.
McLaughlin ME, Kruger GM, Slocum KL, Crowley D, Michaud NA, Huang J, Magendantz M, and Jacks T. 2007. The Nf2 tumor suppressor regulates cell-cell adhesion during tissue fusion. PNAS,104(9):3261-3266.
Ventura, A, Kirsch DG, McLaughlin ME, Tuveson DA, Grimm J, Lintault L, Newman J, Reczek EE, Weissleder R and Jacks T. 2007. Restoration of p53 function leads to tumor regression in vivo. Nature, 445, 661-665
Macpherson D, Conkrite K, Tam M, Mukai S, Mu D, and Jacks T. 2007. Murine bilateral retinoblastoma exhibiting rapid-onset, metastatic progression and N-myc gene amplification. EMBO J, 26, 784-794
Carla F. Kim, Erica L Jackson, Amber E Woolfenden, Sharon Lawrence, Imran Babar, Sinae Vogel, Denise Crowley, Roderick T Bronson, Tyler Jacks  2005. Identification of bronchioalveolar stem cells in normal lung and lung cancer. Cell, 121(6):823-835.
Alejandro Sweet-Cordero, Sayan Mukherjee, Aravind Subramanian, Han You, Jeff Roix, Christine Ladd, Todd R. Golub, Tyler Jacks. 2005. An oncogenic Kras expression signature identified by cross-species gene expression analysis. Nature Genetics, 37 (1), 48-55
Daniela M. Dinulescu, Tan A. Ince, Bradley J. Quade, Sarah A. Shafer, Denise Crowley, Tyler Jacks. 2005. Role of K-ras and Pten in the Development of Mouse Models of Endometriosis and Endometrioid Ovarian Cancer. Nature Medicine, 11 (1), 63–70.
Kenneth P. Olive, David A. Tuveson, Zachary C. Ruhe, Bob Yin, Nicholas A. Willis, Roderick T. Bronson, Denise Crowley, Tyler Jacks. 2004. Mutant p53 Gain-of-Function in Two Mouse Models of Li-Fraumeni Syndrome. Cell, 119 (6), 847–860.
Ventura A, Meissner A, Dillon CP, McManus M, Sharp PA, Van Parijs L, Jaenisch R, Jacks T. 2004. Cre-lox-regulated conditional RNA interference from transgenes. PNAS (101):10380-10385.

External links
Tyler Jacks' lab at MIT
Koch Institute for Cancer Research homepage
Video of Tyler Jacks: Fundamentals of Cancer Research: Introduction and Overview

Living people
Harvard University alumni
University of California, San Francisco alumni
Massachusetts Institute of Technology School of Science faculty
21st-century American biologists
Members of the United States National Academy of Sciences
Howard Hughes Medical Investigators
Fellows of the American Academy of Arts and Sciences
Year of birth missing (living people)
Annual Reviews (publisher) editors